The 1956 Detroit Tigers season was a season in American baseball. The team finished fifth in the American League with a record of 82–72, 15 games behind the New York Yankees.

Offseason 
 December 30, 1955: Leo Cristante and cash were traded by the Tigers to the Brooklyn Dodgers for Pete Wojey.
 Prior to 1956 season: Howie Koplitz was signed as an amateur free agent by the Tigers.

Regular season

Season standings

Record vs. opponents

Notable transactions 
 May 15, 1956: Jim Delsing and Fred Hatfield were traded by the Tigers to the Chicago White Sox for Jim Brideweser, Harry Byrd and Bob Kennedy.

Roster

Player stats

Batting

Starters by position 
Note: Pos = Position; G = Games played; AB = At bats; H = Hits; Avg. = Batting average; HR = Home runs; RBI = Runs batted in

Other batters 
Note: G = Games played; AB = At bats; H = Hits; Avg. = Batting average; HR = Home runs; RBI = Runs batted in

Pitching

Starting pitchers 
Note: G = Games pitched; IP = Innings pitched; W = Wins; L = Losses; ERA = Earned run average; SO = Strikeouts

Other pitchers 
Note: G = Games pitched; IP = Innings pitched; W = Wins; L = Losses; ERA = Earned run average; SO = Strikeouts

Relief pitchers 
Note: G = Games pitched; W = Wins; L = Losses; SV = Saves; ERA = Earned run average; SO = Strikeouts

Farm system 

LEAGUE CHAMPIONS: ValdostaTerre Haute club folded, July 3, 1956

Notes

References 

1956 Detroit Tigers season at Baseball Reference

Detroit Tigers seasons
Detroit Tigers season
Detroit Tigers
1956 in Detroit